The 1986 Honduran Segunda División was the 20th season of the Honduran Segunda División.  Under the management of Carlos Padilla, Universidad won the tournament after finishing first in the final round (or Cuadrangular) and obtained promotion to the 1987–88 Honduran Liga Nacional.

Final round
Also known as Cuadrangular.

Standings

Known results

References

Segunda
1986